Alfréd Márkus (1883–1946) was a Hungarian composer noted for his operettas and film scores. He was from a Jewish background and was involved with the National Hungarian Jewish Cultural Association. Towards the end of his life he left Hungary for the United States where he died in 1946.

Selected filmography
 The Dream Car (1934)

References

Bibliography 
 Shepherd, John. Continuum encyclopedia of popular music of the world, Volumes 3-7. Continuum, 2005.

External links 
 

1883 births
1946 deaths
Hungarian Jews
Hungarian composers
Hungarian male composers
Musicians from Budapest
20th-century Hungarian male musicians
Hungarian emigrants to the United States